"Rubber Ball" was an early 1961 hit for Bobby Vee on Liberty Records. It was the record which made Vee an international star. The song was recorded on August 12, 1960, in a four-song, three-hour session at United in Hollywood. It was produced by Thomas "Snuff" Garrett, arranged by Ernie Freeman, and was co-written at the Brill Building in New York by Gene Pitney, using his mother's maiden name (Orlowski), and by Aaron Schroeder.  Veteran session drummer Earl Palmer played drums at the session.
The record marked Vee's first use of overdubbing his second vocal.

Chart performance
The song was Vee's fifth US single release making #6 on the Billboard charts. Outside the US, "Rubber Ball" was a breakthrough hit for him in the UK, where it reached #4.  In Australia, it was Vee's only #1 record; it stayed at the top for three weeks in early 1961.

Cover versions
A version by British singer Marty Wilde reached #9 the charts in 1961.

Gary Lewis and the Playboys revived the song in 1966 on their album Hits Again!.
M. A. Numminen's Finnish version "Kulipallo" 1998 on his album "Suomihuiput – lastenlaulut"

References

1961 songs
1961 singles
Bobby Vee songs
Number-one singles in Australia
Songs written by Gene Pitney
Songs written by Aaron Schroeder
Song recordings produced by Snuff Garrett
Liberty Records singles